The 2010–11 NHL season was the 94th season of operation (93rd season of play) of the National Hockey League (NHL). The Boston Bruins defeated the Vancouver Canucks in the Stanley Cup Finals four games to three, being the sixth Cup win in Bruins' franchise history. For the fourth consecutive season, the season started with games in Europe. The 58th All-Star Game was held at RBC Center in Raleigh, North Carolina, home arena of the Carolina Hurricanes, on January 30, 2011.

This was the final season of operation for the Atlanta Thrashers, who were sold to True North Sports and Entertainment out of Winnipeg, Manitoba, and moved from Atlanta to Winnipeg to become the "new" Winnipeg Jets. Winnipeg had lost its previous NHL team, also called the Winnipeg Jets, after the 1995–96 NHL season to Phoenix, Arizona, and were renamed "Phoenix Coyotes." This was the second time the city of Atlanta lost an NHL franchise, having previously lost the Atlanta Flames to Calgary, Alberta after the 1979–80 season.

League business

Salary cap
On June 23, 2010, the NHL announced that the salary cap would be increased by $2.6 million. As a result, the new salary cap ceiling is set at $59.4 million, while the salary cap floor is $43.4 million.

U.S. media rights
In April 2011, the NHL reached a new television deal with NBCUniversal, which was acquired by Comcast (owner of the NHL's current cable partner Versus) earlier in the year. The 10-year, US$2 billion deal extended and unified the broadcast and cable television rights to the league, held by NBC and Versus respectively. Notable changes under the new deal included an increase in nationally televised games on Versus (which was to be renamed under the NBC name), a new Thanksgiving Friday game on NBC, holding exclusive rights to all playoff games beginning with the second round (as opposed to the conference championships), and plans to broadcast all playoff games (subject to blackouts during the first round) nationally on NBCUniversal channels.

Entry draft

The 2010 NHL Entry Draft took place on June 25–26, 2010, at the Staples Center in Los Angeles, home arena of the Los Angeles Kings. Taylor Hall was selected first overall in the draft by the Edmonton Oilers, Tyler Seguin was picked second by the Boston Bruins and Erik Gudbranson was chosen third by the Florida Panthers.

Franchise sales
Tom Golisano, Larry Quinn and Daniel DiPofi, owners of the Buffalo Sabres, sold their franchise to Terrence Pegula during the course of the 2010–11 season. The league approved the sale February 18, 2011.

Rule changes

Tie-breaking procedure
Prior to the 2010–11 season, the first tie-breaker to separate teams with equal number of points in a conference was the number of games won, no matter how the wins were obtained. For the 2010–11 season, the league made a modification to this rule. The new rule states that the team with the greater number of games won, excluding wins obtained in the shootout, will be ranked higher. The change was made to reward in-play team victories (regulation or overtime) instead of a win obtained via an individual skill contest. This figure will be tracked in an additional column in the official league standings called ROW (Regulation and overtime wins). In its first year, the tie-breaker proved critical, giving the 106-point, 47-win (44-ROW) Philadelphia Flyers the Atlantic Division title over the 106-point, 49-win (39-ROW) Pittsburgh Penguins, who were seeded fourth rather than second based on the new rule.

Illegal hits to the head
Prior to the 2010–11 season, the Board of Governors, General Managers and the Competition Committee unanimously agreed to implement a new penalty. An illegal hit to the head is a lateral or blind side hit to an opponent where the head is targeted and/or is the principal point of contact is not permitted. Any player who incurs a total of two game misconducts under this rule shall be suspended automatically for the next game his team plays. For each subsequent game misconduct penalty, the automatic suspension shall be increased by one game. The commissioner of the league can increase the suspension longer due to his discretion.

Arena changes 
The Pittsburgh Penguins moved to the newly constructed Consol Energy Center.
The Vancouver Canucks' General Motors Place was renamed Rogers Arena under a 10-year naming rights agreement with Rogers Communications.
 The Calgary Flames' Pengrowth Saddledome was renamed Scotiabank Saddledome.

Uniforms
Several teams announced plans to change their uniforms in the 2010–11 season.

The Buffalo Sabres, as part of their 40th anniversary season, reverted to the classic crossed swords insignia (replacing the infamous "Buffaslug" logo) and a slightly updated uniform based upon the style they wore from 1970 through 1996, when they left Buffalo Memorial Auditorium and moved down the street to the HSBC Arena with blue and gold trim. The blue version was previously their third jersey for the past three seasons. A new third jersey, also in blue, featured the city's name in white script on the chest, along with "quilted" numbers on the back and a gold nameplate with blue lettering fashioning the look of the AHL's former Buffalo Bisons.

The Columbus Blue Jackets unveiled a third jersey November 24 as part of their 10th season celebration. The new  made its debut on November 26 when the Blue Jackets hosted the Detroit Red Wings.

The Philadelphia Flyers adopted their 2010 NHL Winter Classic white uniforms as their new road uniform and dropped the black third jersey they wore since changing to Reebok's "NHL Edge" template.

The New York Islanders reverted to the uniforms they made their debut back in 1972–73; their royal blue uniforms were their third jersey for the past two seasons. The road white uniforms are also from the 1972–73 season.

The New York Rangers inaugurated a new third jersey. The jersey resembled the one worn by the team in its early years, notably during their Stanley Cup championship years of 1928 and 1933, but with "NEW YORK" across the jersey, instead of "RANGERS."

The Toronto Maple Leafs unveiled new home and road jerseys on June 14, 2010, seeing the return of the horizontal stripes on the bottom of the jersey and the "veined leaf" logo on both shoulders. The jersey also includes a white collar with string lace-up instead of a V-shaped collar.

In third jersey items, the Calgary Flames used the third jerseys they debuted in the 2009–10 season onto the Edge template in a retro style from the 1988–89 season. After a three-year hiatus, the Anaheim Ducks unveiled a new third jersey on November 26 against the Chicago Blackhawks. The Los Angeles Kings added a throwback purple and gold uniform, with the original 1967 style of purple, gold and white crown graphic on the jersey front for up to four games, and the Dallas Stars swapped designations on their two white jerseys. The Vancouver Canucks, like the Sabres, were celebrating their 40th anniversary and wore replicas of their original 1970–71 white jerseys for several home games as well. Despite the league rules stating that all team jerseys must have nameplates on the back, both the Canucks and Kings were granted permission to wear jerseys without nameplates. The Washington Capitals, the road team in the 2011 Winter Classic, wore their Winter Classic jerseys in a home game vs. the Montreal Canadiens in honor of former Capital Dino Ciccarelli and his 2010 induction to the Hockey Hall of Fame.

Pre-season

2010 Kraft Hockeyville
Every year since 2006, Kraft Foods has sponsored a contest called Kraft Hockeyville, where small Canadian towns compete against each other for the title of Hockeyville. The winning town also gets to host an NHL preseason game in a local arena, as well as hosting an event called the 'Stanley Cup Jamboree'. Dundas, Ontario, a suburb of Hamilton (which itself has been the subject of numerous efforts at potential National Hockey League expansion) won the 2010 contest, and hosted the pre-season game between the Ottawa Senators and the Buffalo Sabres on September 28, 2010.

European exhibition games

The six teams going to Europe to open their regular seasons there as part of the NHL Premiere games also played exhibition games against European teams under the banner of NHL Premiere Challenge to close out their pre-seasons, finishing with a 6–1–0 record.

Regular season

Premiere games

A record six teams opened the regular season in Europe, in a series branded the "2010 Compuware NHL Premiere Games." On October 7–8, 2010, the Carolina Hurricanes and the Minnesota Wild played two games at the Hartwall Areena in Helsinki, Finland. The Hurricanes swept the Wild. On October 8–9, 2010, the Columbus Blue Jackets and the San Jose Sharks played two games at the Ericsson Globe in Stockholm, Sweden. The two teams split a two-game premiere. On October 9–10, 2010, the Boston Bruins and the Phoenix Coyotes played two games at the O2 Arena in Prague, Czech Republic. The two teams also split a two-game premiere.

The first Premiere Games goal was scored by Minnesota Wild forward Guillaume Latendresse.

NHL face-off
The regular season also began in North America on October 7 with four additional games. In Canada, CBC's Hockey Night in Canada broadcast a double header featuring four Canadian teams. The first game saw the eastern Canadian Original Six-era rivalry rekindled, with the Toronto Maple Leafs hosting the Montreal Canadiens. This game was followed by the Battle of Alberta when the Calgary Flames visited the Edmonton Oilers. In the United States, both 2010 Stanley Cup Finalists were in action as well on Versus. Besides the previously mentioned Philadelphia Flyers-Pittsburgh Penguins game to open Consol Energy Center, the Stanley Cup champion Chicago Blackhawks played against the Colorado Avalanche at Pepsi Center in the nightcap. The Blackhawks had their home opener two nights later against their Central Division rivals, the Detroit Red Wings, and hoisted their first Stanley Cup championship banner in 49 years in a pre-game ceremony.

The first NHL Face-off games goal was scored by Tim Brent of the Toronto Maple Leafs.

Outdoor games

2011 Winter Classic

The Pittsburgh Penguins hosted the 2011 Bridgestone NHL Winter Classic playing the Washington Capitals at Heinz Field on January 1, 2011. The game was telecast on NBC in the USA and on CBC and RDS in Canada. The Washington Capitals won the game 3–1. The game was originally scheduled to be played at 1 pm. However, inclement weather in Pittsburgh forced the NHL to move the game into prime-time at 8 pm.

The Heritage Classic returns

A second outdoor game, the 2011 NHL Heritage Classic, was held in Canada at McMahon Stadium in Calgary, Alberta, on February 20, 2011, between the Calgary Flames and the Montreal Canadiens. CBC, RDS and Versus telecasted the game. This was the second outdoor game held in Canada following the Heritage Classic in 2003 when the Montreal Canadiens defeated the Edmonton Oilers 4–3 at Commonwealth Stadium in Edmonton, Alberta. The Heritage classic resulted in the Flames defeating the Canadiens 4–0. This event was recorded as the first shutout in any NHL outdoor game.

Hockey Days

Canada
CBC hosted its 11th annual Hockey Day in Canada event on February 12, 2011, in Whitehorse, Yukon. The network broadcast a triple header of games featuring all six Canadian teams. The Edmonton Oilers hosted the Ottawa Senators, the Toronto Maple Leafs visited the Montreal Canadiens and the Vancouver Canucks welcomed the Calgary Flames.

United States
For the first time ever, the NHL and NBC hosted a Hockey Day in America event on February 20, 2011, featuring eight of the most popular American NHL teams. The Philadelphia Flyers defeated the New York Rangers 4–2, the Washington Capitals defeated the Buffalo Sabres 2–1, the Red Wings defeated the Minnesota Wild 2–1, and the highlight game of the afternoon, a meeting of the last two Stanley Cup champions, as the Penguins were defeated by the Blackhawks 3–2. The event was part of the broader Hockey Weekend Across America organized by USA Hockey.

Highlights
On October 30, 2010, four penalty shot goals were scored on one night for the first time in league history.
David Booth, Frans Nielsen, Ryan Callahan and Dave Steckel were the scorers. The previous record was three penalty shot goals in one night. Four penalty shot attempts in one night had occurred previously.

On November 20, 2010, the 50,000th game in the NHL's history was played, counting all regular season and playoff games, going back to the league's inaugural season in 1917.

Standings
The Vancouver Canucks placed first overall, winning the Presidents' Trophy and home advantage throughout the playoffs. The Washington Capitals placed first in the Eastern Conference, earning home advantage in Eastern Conference playoffs.

Note: Bolded teams qualified for the playoffs.

Under NHL rules, first-place teams in each division receive a conference ranking between 1 and 3 regardless of overall points. The Pittsburgh Penguins placed fourth yet had more points than the Boston Bruins, but the Bruins placed first in the Northeast Division to get the third-place ranking.

Attendance

Notes
 Totals do not include six regular-season opening games played in Europe, and two outdoor regular season games. 
 The Carolina Hurricanes played the Minnesota Wild at Hartwall Areena in Helsinki, Finland.
 The Columbus Blue Jackets played the San Jose Sharks at the Ericsson Globe in Stockholm, Sweden
 The Boston Bruins played the Phoenix Coyotes at O2 Arena in Prague, Czech Republic.
 The Washington Capitals played the Pittsburgh Penguins outdoors in the Winter Classic at Heinz Field in Pittsburgh, Pennsylvania. 
 The Montreal Canadiens played the Calgary Flames outdoors in the Heritage Classic at McMahon Stadium in Calgary, Alberta.
 As of October 2010, Calgary's Pengrowth Saddledome was renamed Scotiabank Saddledome.
As of August 2011, Buffalo's HSBC Arena was renamed First Niagara Center.
Following the 2010–11 season, the Atlanta Thrashers relocated and became the new Winnipeg Jets.
As of March 15, 2012, the Carolina Hurricanes venue, RBC Center, has been renamed PNC Arena.

Playoffs

Bracket

NHL awards

All-Star teams

Player statistics

Scoring leaders
The following players led the league in points at the conclusion of the regular season.

GP = Games played; G = Goals; A = Assists; Pts = Points; +/– = Plus-minus; PIM = Penalty minutes

Source: NHL

Leading goaltenders
The following goaltenders led the league in goals against average at the end of the regular season while playing at least 1800 minutes.

GP = Games played; Min = Minutes played; W = Wins; L = Losses; OT = Overtime/shootout losses; GA = Goals against; SO = Shutouts; SV% = Save percentage; GAA = Goals against average

Coaching changes

Off-season
Atlanta Thrashers: Craig Ramsay replaced the fired John Anderson.
Columbus Blue Jackets: Scott Arniel became head coach, replacing interim Claude Noel, who had replaced the fired Ken Hitchcock on February 3, 2010.
Edmonton Oilers: Tom Renney replaced Pat Quinn, who moved into a role of senior hockey advisor for the team.
New Jersey Devils: John MacLean replaced Jacques Lemaire, who retired.
St. Louis Blues: Davis Payne returned for a full season after replacing Andy Murray, who was fired on January 2, 2010.
Philadelphia Flyers: Peter Laviolette returned for a full season after replacing John Stevens, who was fired on December 4, 2009.
Tampa Bay Lightning: Guy Boucher replaced the fired Rick Tocchet.

In-season
New Jersey Devils: John MacLean was fired as head coach after a 9–22–2 start. Jacques Lemaire, who had retired (per above), then returned to serve as interim head coach.
New York Islanders: Jack Capuano replaced Scott Gordon after Gordon was fired on November 15, 2010.

Milestones

First games

The following is a list of notable players who played their first NHL game in 2010–11, listed with their first team:

Last games

The following is a list of players of note who played their last NHL game in 2010–11, listed with their team:

The 2010–11 season also saw the passings of several NHL players, current and former. This list includes players who were playing elsewhere at the time.

Major milestones reached
 On October 22, 2010, Ottawa Senators forward Daniel Alfredsson recorded a hat trick, with the third goal being his 1,000th career NHL point. He became the 75th player in league history to record 1,000 points.
 On October 26, Colorado Avalanche defenceman John-Michael Liles recorded an assist in his ninth consecutive game to give him the NHL record for longest assist streak for a defenceman from the start of season. 
 On October 26, Ottawa Senators defenceman Sergei Gonchar participated in his 1,000th NHL game.
 On October 28, Calgary Flames forward Craig Conroy participated in his 1,000th NHL game.
 On November 3, Buffalo Sabres forward Mike Grier participated in his 1,000th NHL game.
 On November 6, Los Angeles Kings forward Ryan Smyth participated in his 1,000th NHL game.
 On November 22, Ottawa Senators forward Alexei Kovalev recorded his 1,000th career NHL point with a goal. He became the 76th player in league history to record 1,000 points, and the third Russian born player to do so.
 On November 24, Boston Bruins forward Mark Recchi scored two goals, with the second being his 1,500th career NHL point. He became the 13th player in league history to reach this milestone.
 On December 26, Phoenix Coyotes defenceman Ed Jovanovski participated in his 1,000th NHL game.
 On December 27, Detroit Red Wings goaltender Chris Osgood recorded his 400th NHL win. He became the 10th player in league history to reach this milestone.
 On January 11, 2011, Toronto Maple Leafs coach Ron Wilson won his 600th game as an NHL coach. He became the seventh coach in league history to reach this milestone.
 On January 17, San Jose Sharks forward Patrick Marleau and Dallas Stars forward Jamie Langenbrunner both participated in their 1,000th NHL game in separate contests. Marleau was the third youngest player in NHL history to reach 1,000 games played.
 On February 1, Minnesota Wild forward Andrew Brunette participated in his 1,000th NHL game.
 On February 10, New Jersey Devils coach Jacques Lemaire won his 600th game as an NHL coach. He became the eighth coach in league history to reach this milestone.
 On February 16, Florida Panthers forward Cory Stillman participated in his 1,000th NHL game.
 On February 20, Detroit Red Wings forward Todd Bertuzzi participated in his 1,000th NHL game.
 On March 20, Phoenix Coyotes defenceman Adrian Aucoin participated in his 1,000th NHL game.
 On April 1, Calgary Flames forward Jarome Iginla scored two goals and added an assist to reach 1,000 career points. He became the 77th player in league history to do so.
 On April 8, San Jose Sharks forward Joe Thornton recorded his 1,000th career NHL point with a goal. He became the 78th player to reach the milestone and the fourth this season.
 On April 9, Montreal Canadiens coach Jacques Martin won his 600th game as an NHL coach. He became the ninth coach in league history to reach this milestone.
 On April 9, Boston Bruins forward Mark Recchi played in his 1,652nd NHL game, surpassing Chris Chelios for sole possession of the fourth spot on the NHL's all-time games played list.

See also 
 2010–11 NHL transactions
 2010–11 NHL suspensions and fines
 2010 NHL Entry Draft
 2010 in sports
 2011 in sports
 List of 2010–11 NHL Three Star Awards

References

Further reading

External links

2010–11 NHL season at Hockey Reference

 
1
1